Eunoe sentiformis is a scale worm described from the East Siberian Sea in the Arctic Ocean.

Description
Number of segments 36; elytra 15 pairs. Dorsum with scattered brownish pigment. Prostomium anterior margin comprising two rounded lobes. Lateral antennae inserted ventrally (beneath prostomium and median antenna). Notochaetae about as thick as neurochaetae. Bidentate neurochaetae absent.

References

Phyllodocida